Di Rocco is an Italian surname. Notable people with this name include:

Alex Di Rocco (born 1970), French footballer
 (1896–1968), Italian politician
 (born 1977), Italian singer-songwriter
Michele di Rocco (born 1982), Italian boxer of Romani origin
 (born 1947), Italian sports executive
Sandra Di Rocco (born 1967), Italian-Swedish mathematician